Dragon Lady Press was the publishing wing of the Toronto-based comic book store Dragon Lady Comics, operating from 1985 to 1988. The company was known for its reprints of classic newspaper comic strips in various forms. Its publications were distributed through the direct market throughout the United States and Canada.

Titles published 
 Alley Oop Quarterly, 3 issues (Nov. 1987–Jan. 1988)
 The Best of the Tribune Co., 4 issues (Sept. 1985–Apr. 1986) — continues in Thrilling Adventure Strips
 Bravo for Adventure (Alex Toth), 1 issue (Jan. 1987)
 Buz Sawyer Quarterly, 3 issues (Nov. 1986–Apr. 1987)
 Classic Adventure Strips, 16 issues (Jan. 1985–Aug. 1987)
 The Complete Max Collins/Rick Fletcher Dick Tracy, 3 issues (June 1986–Aug. 1987)
 Dragon Lady Press Presents, 16 issues (Jan. 1986–Jan. 1988)
 Dragon Lady Productions, 2 issues ([Aug.] 1985–[Oct.] 1985)
 Johnny Hazard Quarterly, 10 issues (Aug. 1986-Aug. 1987)
 Red Ryder
 Science Fiction Classics, 1 issue (Nov. 1987)
 Thrilling Adventure Strips, 16 issues (June 1986–Apr. 1987) —  continues from The Best of the Tribune Co.
 Wash Tubbs Quarterly, 7 issues (Oct. 1986 - Nov. 1987)

References

External links 
 
 

Comic book publishing companies of Canada
Defunct comics and manga publishing companies